Citrus warburgiana. the kakamadu or New Guinea wild lime, grows on the south coast of the Papuan Peninsula near Alotau in Papua-New Guinea.

It is a poorly known tree species. It is taxonomically an Australian lime:

{{clade| style=font-size:100%;line-height:100%
|label1=Australian limes
|1={{clade
|label1=former Eremocitrus
  |1=Citrus glauca
  |label2=former Microcitrus
  |2={{clade
     |1=Citrus warburgiana
     |2={{clade
        |1=        |2=
        |3=Citrus australis}} }} }} }}

This wild lime is a species of Microcitrus according to the Swingle system, called Microcitrus warburgiana, and according to the classification of David Mabberley, it is to be called Citrus warburgiana. It is the only Microcitrus coming from outside Australia.

See also 
Citrus taxonomy

Notes

References 
 
 Citrus Genome

External links 
 Home Citrus Grower with photos

Bushfood
warburgiana
Edible plants
Flora of New Guinea
Plants described in 1901
warburgiana